HS Rīga are a Latvian ice hockey team that plays in the Optibet Hockey League, the top tier of the sport in Latvia. The team is based in Riga and play their home games at the Hokeja halle Riga.

History
Hockey School Rīga was founded on November 30, 1999, and is overseen in part by Riga City Council. As a hockey school, players undertake educational classes as well as hockey training; to this end HS Rīga has a boarding school attached to their training facility. As a result of this, the majority of the players on HS Rīga's Optibet Hockey League squad are teenagers. The schools first organised team competed under the name 'SK Rīga 18' in the 2004-05 LHL season, where they finished in last place. It wasn't until the 2008-09 season that the school fielded another side, this time finishing in 7th, whilst also competing in the Latvian U20's league, where they finished 3rd. Between 2009-2014 the school exclusively fielded teams in a range of U18 and U20 leagues, including the Belarusian U18 league, which they won in 2011.

Beginning in the 2015-16 season, under the moniker HS Rīga, the team again competed in Latvia's top tier, finishing 6th out of 7 teams. HS Rīga have competed in the Latvian top tier, now called the Optibet Hockey League for sponsorship reasons, ever since. Their best finish was 5th place in both 2017 & 2018, however, they have so far been unable to advance past the quarter-finals in post-season play.

In addition to their senior, HS Rīga also field a number of junior sides, from U9 up to U17, as well as a team in the JAHL, the Junior Development Hockey League.

Roster 
Updated February 5, 2021.

Season-by-season record
Note: GP = Games played, W = Wins, L = Losses, T = Ties, OTL = Overtime losses, Pts = Points, GF = Goals for, GA = Goals against, PIM = Penalties in minutes

Team records

Career
These are the top five scorers in HS Rīga history.

''Note: Pos = Position; GP = Games played; G = Goals; A = Assists; Pts = Points

Penalty minutes: Ričards Briška, 128

Season

Regular season 
 Most goals in a season: Roberts Lipsbergs, 60 (2010–11)
 Most assists in a season: Roberts Lipsbergs, 47 (2010–11)
 Most points in a season: Roberts Lipsbergs, 107 (2010–11)
 Most penalty minutes in a season: Aldis Popens, 119 (2007–08)

Playoffs 
 Most goals in a playoff season: Oļegs Šišļaņņikovs, 3 (2016–17)
 Most assists in a playoff season: Oļegs Šišļaņņikovs, 3 (2016–17)
 Most points in a playoff season: Oļegs Šišļaņņikovs, 6 (2016–17)
 Most penalty minutes in a playoff season: Aleksejs Popovs, 22 (2015–16)

Notable players
 Rihards Bukarts
 Miks Indrašis
 Roberts Lipsbergs
 Gints Meija

References

External links
 HS Rīga
 

Ice hockey clubs established in 1999
Latvian Hockey League teams
1999 establishments in Latvia
Sport in Riga
Ice hockey teams in Latvia